Nuenen, Gerwen en Nederwetten is a municipality consisting of the larger village of Nuenen and two adjacent smaller ones. From being a small farmers town of less than 1000 inhabitants around 1950 Nuenen grew steadily as ever more new employees of Philips and the Eindhoven University (TUE) chose Nuenen as their new home.

Population centres

History
A battle fought in Nuenen during World War II was shown in an episode of the miniseries Band of Brothers. The historical battle took place there during Operation Market-Garden in September 1944.

Politics

Municipal government
As of the 2018 municipal election, The municipal council of Nuenen contains eight parties. The municipal executive consists of four coalition parties: W70 Nuenen, GreenLeft (GL), Christian Democratic Appeal (CDA) and Naturally Nuenen (Socialist Party before), the latter of which has an independent Alderman.

!style="background-color:#E9E9E9" align=center colspan=2|Party
!style="background-color:#E9E9E9" align=right|Seats
|-
|bgcolor="#fcda00" width=2|
|align=left|W70 Nuenen||
|-
| 
|align=left|People's Party for Freedom and Democracy||
|-
| 
|align=left|GreenLeft||
|-
| 
|align=left|Labour Party||
|-
| 
|align=left|Democrats 66||
|-
| 
|align=left|Christian Democratic Appeal||
|-
|bgcolor="#d3d3d3" width=2|
|align=left|Naturally Nuenen||
|-
|bgcolor="#d3d3d3" width=2|
|align=left|Combination Nuenen c.a.||
|}

Notable people

Vincent van Gogh
Vincent van Gogh (1853–1890) spent two years in Nuenen from 1883 to 1885. His father lived and worked there as the Protestant pastor in the largely catholic environment. Van Gogh lived in the small carriagehouse next to the beautiful pastor's house, which is well preserved and visited by art lovers from all over the world. Van Gogh was extremely productive in his years in Nuenen. It is referred to as his so-called dark or sombre period. Here he painted his famous painting The potato eaters as well as  Congregation Leaving the Reformed Church in Nuenen (Het uitgaan van de hervormde kerk te Nuenen). The latter painting was stolen from the Van Gogh Museum in December 2002.

Edsger Dijkstra
Edsger Dijkstra (1930–2002), Dutch computer scientist, then a professor in the Mathematics Department at the Technical University of Eindhoven, moved to a newly built house in Nuenen in 1964. Nuenen was added to the world map of computer science in 1973 when Dijkstra started to circulate his reports signed ‘Burroughs Research Fellow’ with his home address. Many thought that Burroughs, a company known at that time for the production of computers based on an innovative hardware architecture, was based in Nuenen. In fact, Dijkstra was the only research fellow of Burroughs Corporation and worked for it from home, occasionally travelling to its branches in the USA. Dijkstra moved in 1984 to the University of Austin, Texas, USA, until his retirement in the autumn of 1999. Dijkstra returned from Austin, terminally ill, to his original house in Nuenen in February 2002, where he died half a year later, on 6 August 2002.

and 
 Django Wagner, Dutch Wiki (born 1970 in Nuenen) a sinti, folk musician
 Ruud Kuijten (born 1973 in Nuenen) a male, right-handed, Belgian badminton player
 Willemijn Verkaik (born 1975) is a Dutch singer and actress, brought up in Nuenen
 Paulus Schäfer (born 1978 in Gerwen) a gypsy jazz guitarist, composer and arranger
 Steven Kruijswijk (born 1987 in Nuenen) a Dutch road bicycle racer

Gallery

References

External links

Official website

 
Municipalities of North Brabant